Chef Roblé & Co.  is an American reality documentary television series on Bravo that debuted December 4, 2011.  The series chronicles the life of celebrity chef Roblé Ali and his attempt to launch a high-end catering company in New York City with his older sister, Jasmine. In April 2013, it was announced that the series had been renewed for a second season, which debuted June 5, 2013.

Cast

Main
 Roblé Ali - Roblé was born in Poughkeepsie, New York. After graduating from Poughkeepsie High School, Roblé attended the Culinary Institute of America in Hyde Park, New York.  After culinary school Roblé moved to New York City, where he developed a reputation as one of the hottest up-and-coming chefs. He worked through the ranks as the youngest sous chef ever at Abigail Kirsch, an elite New York catering company, and alongside Chris Santos as Chef de cuisine of Restaurant Mojo and on the opening of Stanton Social. Since then, he has cooked for the likes of R&B diva Faith Evans, Rachel Dratch, music mogul Russell Simmons, and Michael Jackson.
 Jasmine Ali

Supporting

 Adam C. Banks
 Artie Thompson
 Che 'Gravy' Gaines
 D'Andre Brunson
 Dan Cathcart (season 2)
 Jeorge Robbins (season 2)
 Kikuyo 'Kiku' Polk
 Rob McCue (season 2)
 Shawn Knights

Episodes

Series overview

Season 1 (2011–2012)

Season 2 (2013)

References

External links 

 
 

2010s American reality television series
2011 American television series debuts
English-language television shows
Food reality television series
Bravo (American TV network) original programming
2013 American television series endings